The extensor digiti minimi  (extensor digiti quinti proprius) is a slender muscle of the forearm, placed on the ulnar side of the extensor digitorum communis, with which it is generally connected.

It arises from the common extensor tendon by a thin tendinous slip and frequently from the intermuscular septa between it and the adjacent muscles.

Its tendon passes through a compartment of the extensor retinaculum, posterior to distal radio-ulnar joint, then divides into two as it crosses the dorsum of the hand, and finally joins the extensor digitorum tendon. All three tendons attach to the dorsal digital expansion of the fifth digit (little finger). There may be a slip of tendon to the fourth digit.

Variations 
An additional fibrous slip from the lateral epicondyle; the tendon of insertion may not divide or may send a slip to the ring finger.

Absence of muscle rare; fusion of the belly with the extensor digitorum communis not uncommon.

Variations to the fifth extensor compartment, which the extensor digiti minimi runs through, may cause tenosynovitis and can limit the use of the extensor digiti minimi.

Extensor digiti minimi can also be bifurcated, which means split, at many different points in the muscle.

Functions
The extensor digiti minimi is a two joint muscle. It acts as an extensor in both joints. It extends the wrist, which means it moves the back of the hand toward the back of the forearm. It also extends the little finger, which means it straightens the little finger from a fist.

Additional images

References

External links
 

Muscles of the upper limb